Rudolf "Rudi" Fischer (19 April 1912 – 30 December 1976) was a racing driver from Switzerland.

Fischer participated in eight World Championship Grands Prix, debuting on 27 May 1951. He achieved two podium finishes, and scored a total of 10 championship points. He also participated in numerous non-Championship Formula One and Formula Two races.

Career
Fischer finished third in a race which marked the reopening of the AVUS, a German motor racing circuit. It had been closed for a 14-year period and was damaged during World War II. A crowd of 350,000 watched Paul Greifzu of Suhl, Thuringia, win in a car he built himself. Fischer drove a Ferrari to third place over a distance of 207.5 kilometres. His time was 1 hour, 10 minutes, 27.5 seconds. In the 1952 Swiss Grand Prix, in Bern, Fischer finished second to Piero Taruffi; both drivers were in Ferraris.

Écurie Espadon/Scuderia Espadon
Fischer was the leader of the "Écurie Espadon", the entrant name for most of his racing career.

Écurie Espadon was composed of a group of Swiss amateur gentleman racers. The word "Écurie" was used at the beginning as most of the team's cars were French, generally Gordinis. Later the team's equipment changed to Ferraris and other Italian vehicles, thus the name of the team changed to use the equivalent Italian word "Scuderia".

The team was involved in several races all over Europe, as the presentation document described.

The team was composed of:
 Rudolf Fischer: a successful restaurant owner.
 Rudolf Schoeller
 Peter Hirt: a wealthy businessman from Küssnacht, near Zürich, involved in precision tool manufacturing.
 Peter (Pierre) Staechelin from Basel.
 Max de Terra
 Paul Glauser

Racing record

Post WWII Grandes Épreuves results
(key)

Complete Formula One World Championship results
(key)

 Entered and practiced in his Ferrari 500, but engine failure meant that he reverted to the previous season's 212 model for the race. Drive shared with Peter Hirt.

References

1912 births
1976 deaths
Sportspeople from Stuttgart
Swiss racing drivers
Swiss Formula One drivers
Écurie Espadon Formula One drivers
Formula One team owners